This article presents the discography of all albums and singles released by the Australian pop rock group Men at Work. It includes three studio albums, three live albums, numerous compilation albums, three extended plays, two video albums, and 14 singles.

Albums

Studio albums

Live albums

Major compilations

Extended plays

Singles

Video albums
 Live in San Francisco... Or Was It Berkeley? (1984, VHS/Beta)
 Live in San Bernardino (2010, DVD)

References

Rock music group discographies
New wave discographies
Discographies of Australian artists
Discography